Hannah Sarah O'Sullivan (born May 11, 1998) is an American amateur golfer. She was raised in Chandler, Arizona and went to Hamilton High School.

O'Sullivan was a semifinalist at the 2014 U.S. Women's Amateur.

Her win at the 2015 Gateway Classic makes her the youngest winner in the history of the Symetra Tour.

She qualified for the 2015 U.S. Women's Open.

She won the 2015 U.S. Women's Amateur.

In May 2016, O'Sullivan became the top female golfer in the World Amateur Golf Ranking.

She played college golf at Duke University.

Amateur wins
2010 Stockton Sports Commission Junior Open
2015 Winn Grips Heather Farr Classic, Rolex Girls Junior Championship, Rolex Tournament of Champions, U.S. Women's Amateur

Source:

Professional wins

Symetra Tour wins
2015 Gateway Classic (as an amateur)

Team appearances
Amateur
Junior Ryder Cup (representing the United States): 2014 (winners)
Junior Solheim Cup (representing the United States): 2015 (winners)
Curtis Cup (representing the United States): 2016

References

External links

American female golfers
Amateur golfers
Duke Blue Devils women's golfers
1998 births
Living people